Okibacterium fritillariae is a bacterium from the genus Okibacterium which has been isolated from seeds of Fritillaria ruthenica and Clematis recta.

References

Microbacteriaceae
Bacteria described in 2002